The Ministry of Defence (MOD or MoD) is the department responsible for implementing the defence policy set by His Majesty's Government, and is the headquarters of the British Armed Forces.

The MOD states that its principal objectives are to defend the United Kingdom of Great Britain and Northern Ireland and its interests and to strengthen international peace and stability. The MOD also manages day-to-day running of the armed forces, contingency planning and defence procurement.

The expenditure, administration and policy of the MOD are scrutinised by the Defence Select Committee, except for Defence Intelligence which instead falls under the Intelligence and Security Committee of Parliament.

History
During the 1920s and 1930s, British civil servants and politicians, looking back at the performance of the state during the First World War, concluded that there was a need for greater co-ordination between the three services that made up the armed forces of the United Kingdom: the Royal Navy, the British Army and the Royal Air Force. The formation of a united ministry of defence was rejected by the coalition government of David Lloyd George in 1921, but the Chiefs of Staff Committee was formed in 1923, for the purposes of inter-service co-ordination. As rearmament became a concern during the 1930s, Stanley Baldwin created the position of Minister for Co-ordination of Defence. Lord Chatfield held the post until the fall of Neville Chamberlain's government in 1940. His success was limited by his lack of control over the existing Service departments, and his lack of political influence.

On forming his government in 1940, Winston Churchill created the office of Minister of Defence, to exercise ministerial control over the Chiefs of Staff Committee and to co-ordinate defence matters. The post was held by the Prime Minister of the day until Clement Attlee's government introduced the Ministry of Defence Act of 1946. After 1946, the three posts of Secretary of State for War, First Lord of the Admiralty, and Secretary of State for Air were formally subordinated to the new Minister of Defence, who had a seat in the Cabinet. The three service ministers — Admiralty, War, Air — remained in direct operational control of their respective services, but ceased to attend Cabinet.

From 1946 to 1964, five Departments of State did the work of the modern Ministry of Defence: the Admiralty, the War Office, the Air Ministry, the Ministry of Aviation, and an earlier form of the Ministry of Defence. Those departments merged in 1964, and the defence functions of the Ministry of Aviation Supply were merged into the Ministry of Defence in 1971. The unification of all defence activities under a single ministry was motivated by a desire to curb interservice rivalries and followed the precedent set by the American National Security Act of 1947.

Ministerial team
The Ministers in the Ministry of Defence are as follows:

Senior military officials

Chiefs of the Defence Staff
The Chief of the Defence Staff (CDS) is the professional head of the British Armed Forces and the most senior uniformed military adviser to the Secretary of State for Defence and the Prime Minister.

The CDS is supported by the Vice Chief of the Defence Staff (VCDS) who deputises and is responsible for the day-to-day running of the armed services aspect of the MOD through the Central Staff, working closely alongside the Permanent Secretary. They are joined by the professional heads of the three British armed services (Royal Navy, British Army and Royal Air Force) and the Commander of Strategic Command. All personnel sit at OF-9 rank in the NATO rank system.

Together the Chiefs of Staff form the Chiefs of Staff Committee with responsibility for providing advice on operational military matters and the preparation and conduct of military operations.

The current Chiefs of Staff are as follows.
 Chief of the Defence Staff – Admiral Sir Tony Radakin
 Vice-Chief of the Defence Staff – General Gwyn Jenkins
 First Sea Lord and Chief of the Naval Staff – Admiral Sir Ben Key (Head of the Royal Navy)
 Chief of the General Staff – General Sir Patrick Sanders (Head of the British Army)
 Chief of the Air Staff – Air Chief Marshal Sir Mike Wigston (Head of the Royal Air Force)
 Commander of Strategic Command – General Sir James Hockenhull

Other senior military officers 
The Chief of Staff is supported by several Deputy Chiefs of the Defence Staff and senior officers at OF-8 rank.
 Chief of Defence People – Lieutenant General James Swift
 Deputy Chief of Defence Staff (Military Strategy and Operations) – Lieutenant-General Roland Walker
 Deputy Chief of Defence Staff (Financial and Military Capability) – Air Marshal Sir Richard Knighton
 Chief of Joint Operations – Lieutenant-General Charles Stickland, based at Northwood Headquarters
 Defence Senior Adviser Middle East – Air Marshal Martin Sampson
 Chief of Defence Intelligence – Adrian Bird
 Director-General of the Defence Safety Authority – Air Marshal Stephen Shell

Additionally, there are a number of Assistant Chiefs of Defence Staff, including the Defence Services Secretary in the Royal Household of the Sovereign of the United Kingdom, who is also the Assistant Chief of Defence Staff (Personnel).

Senior management
Permanent Secretary and other senior officials
The Ministers and Chiefs of the Defence Staff are supported by several civilian, scientific and professional military advisors. The Permanent Under-Secretary of State for Defence (generally known as the Permanent Secretary) is the senior civil servant at the MOD. Their role is to ensure that it operates effectively as a government department and has responsibility for the strategy, performance, reform, organisation and the finances of the MOD.
The role works closely with the Chief of the Defence Staff in leading the organisation and supporting Ministers in the conduct of business in the Department across the full range of responsibilities.
 Permanent Under-Secretary of State for Defence – David Williams
 Director General Finance – Charlie Pate
 Director General Nuclear – Vanessa Nicholls
 Director General Security Policy - Dominic Wilson
 Director General Commercial - Andrew Forzani
 Director General Strategy and International – Angus Lapsley
 MOD Chief Scientific Adviser – Dame Angela McLean
 MOD Chief Scientific Adviser (Nuclear) – Professor Robin Grimes
 Lead Non-Executive Board Member – Lord Grimstone
 Non-Executive Defence Board Member and Chair of the Defence Audit Committee – Simon Henry
 Non-Executive Defence Board Member and Chair of the Defence Equipment and Support Board – Paul Skinner
 Non-Executive Defence Board Member and Chair of the People Committee – Danuta Gray

Defence policy

The Strategic Defence and Security Review 2015 included £178 billion investment in new equipment and capabilities. The review set a defence policy with four primary missions for the Armed Forces:
 Defend and contribute to the security and resilience of the UK and Overseas Territories.
 Provide the nuclear deterrent.
 Contribute to improved understanding of the world through strategic intelligence and the global defence network.
 Reinforce international security and the collective capacity of our allies, partners and multilateral institutions.
The review stated the Armed Forces will also contribute to the government's response to crises by being prepared to:
 Support humanitarian assistance and disaster response, and conduct rescue missions.
 Conduct strike operations.
 Conduct operations to restore peace and stability.
 Conduct major combat operations if required, including under NATO Article 5.

Governance and departmental organisation

Governance 
Defence is governed and managed by several committees.
 The Defence Council provides the formal legal basis for the conduct of defence in the UK through a range of powers vested in it by statute and Letters Patent. It too is chaired by the Secretary of State, and its members are ministers, the senior officers and senior civilian officials.
 The Defence Board is the main MOD corporate board chaired by the Secretary of State oversees the strategic direction and oversight of defence, supported by an Investment Approvals Committee, Audit Committee and People Committee. The board's membership comprises the Secretary of State, the Armed Forces Minister, the Permanent Secretary, the Chief and Vice Chief of the Defence Staff, the Chief of Defence Materiel, Director General Finance and three non-executive board members.
 Head Office and Corporate Services (HOCS), which is made up of the Head Office and a range of corporate support functions. It has two joint heads the Chief of the Defence Staff and the Permamant Secretary who are the combined TLB holders for this unit they are responsible for directing the other TLB holders.

Departmental organisation 
The following organisational groups come under the control of the MOD.

Top level budgets

The MOD comprises seven top-level budgets. The head of each organisation is personally accountable for the performance and outputs of their particular organisation. These are:
 Navy Command - Royal Navy
 Army Command - British Army
 Air Command - Royal Air Force
 Strategic Command
 Defence Nuclear Organisation
 Defence Infrastructure Organisation
 Head Office and Corporate Services
Bespoke trading entity
 Defence Equipment and Support (DE&S)
Executive agencies
 Defence Electronics and Components Agency (DECA)
 Defence Science and Technology Laboratory (Dstl)
 UK Hydrographic Office (UKHO) – also has trading fund status.
 Submarine Delivery Agency (SDA)
Executive non-departmental public bodies
 National Museum of the Royal Navy
 National Army Museum
 Royal Air Force Museum
 Single Source Regulations Office (SSRO)
Advisory non-departmental public bodies
 Advisory Committee on Conscientious Objectors
 Advisory Group on Military Medicine
 Armed Forces Pay Review Body
 Defence Nuclear Safety Committee
 Independent Medical Expert Group
 National Employer Advisory Board
 Nuclear Research Advisory Council
 Scientific Advisory Committee on the Medical Implications of Less-Lethal Weapons
 Veterans Advisory and Pensions Committees
Ad-hoc advisory group
 Central Advisory Committee on Compensation
Other bodies
 Commonwealth War Graves Commission
 Defence Academy of the United Kingdom
 Defence Sixth Form College
 Defence and Security Media Advisory Committee
 Fleet Air Arm Museum
 Independent Monitoring Board for the Military Corrective Training Centre (Colchester)
 Reserve Forces' and Cadets' Associations
 Royal Hospital Chelsea
 Royal Marines Museum
 Royal Navy Submarine Museum
 Service Complaints Ombudsman
 Service Prosecuting Authority
 United Kingdom Reserve Forces Association
Public corporations
 The Oil and Pipelines Agency (OPA)
Enabling organisation
 Defence Business Services (DBS)

In addition, the MOD is responsible for the administration of the Sovereign Base Areas of Akrotiri and Dhekelia in Cyprus.

Contracting
Competitive procurement processes are used whenever possible, and all new direct tender and contract opportunities valued over £10,000 are advertised on a system called the Defence Sourcing Portal. A separate internal policy generally operates in respect of low value purchasing below this threshold.

DEFCON contract conditions are numbered defence contract conditions are in contracts issued by the MOD (not to be confused with DEFCON as used by the United States Armed Forces, which refers to a level of military "defense readiness condition").

Examples include:
DEFCON 534: Subcontracting and prompt payment
DEFCON 620: a change control procedure 
DEFCON 658 (cyber) applies to all suppliers down the supply chain
DEFCON 659 relates to security measures for disclosure of "Secret Matters" including within the supply chain, requiring a contractor to ensure that employees "engaged on any work in connection with the Contract have notice that the Official Secrets Acts 1911-1989 apply to them and will continue so to apply after the completion or termination of the Contract", potentially also requiring employees to "sign a statement acknowledging that, both during the term of the Contract and after its completion or termination", they are bound by the Official Secrets Acts 1911-1989 (and where applicable by any other legislation).
DEFCON 705: the MOD’s standard IPR condition for fully funded research and technology contracts.

A full set of the DEFCONs can be accessed via the MoD's Defence Gateway (registration required).

Property portfolio
The Ministry of Defence is one of the United Kingdom's largest landowners, owning 227,300 hectares of land and foreshore (either freehold or leasehold) at April 2014, which was valued at "about £20 billion". The MOD also has "rights of access" to a further 222,000 hectares. In total, this is about 1.8% of the UK land mass. The total annual cost to support the defence estate is "in excess of £3.3 billion".

The defence estate is divided as training areas & ranges (84.0%), research & development (5.4%), airfields (3.4%), barracks & camps (2.5%), storage & supply depots (1.6%), and other (3.0%). These are largely managed by the Defence Infrastructure Organisation.

Main Building 

The headquarters of the MOD are in Whitehall and is known as MOD Main Building. This structure is neoclassical in style and was originally built between 1938 and 1959 to designs by Vincent Harris to house the Air Ministry and the Board of Trade. A major refurbishment of the building was completed under a Private Finance Initiative contract by Skanska in 2004. The northern entrance in Horse Guards Avenue is flanked by two monumental statues, Earth and Water,  by Charles Wheeler. Opposite stands the Gurkha Monument, sculpted by Philip Jackson and unveiled in 1997 by Queen Elizabeth II. Within it is the Victoria Cross and George Cross Memorial, and nearby are memorials to the Fleet Air Arm and RAF (to its east, facing the riverside).

Henry VIII's wine cellar at the Palace of Whitehall, built in 1514–1516 for Cardinal Wolsey, is in the basement of Main Building, and is used for entertainment.  The entire vaulted brick structure of the cellar was encased in steel and concrete and relocated nine feet to the west and nearly  deeper in 1949, when construction was resumed at the site after the Second World War. This was carried out without any significant damage to the structure.

Controversies

Fraud

The most notable fraud conviction has been that of Gordon Foxley, Director of Ammunition Procurement at the Ministry of Defence from 1981 to 1984. Police claimed he received at least £3.5m in total in corrupt payments, such as substantial bribes from overseas arms contractors aiming to influence the allocation of contracts.

Germ and chemical warfare tests
A government report covered by The Guardian newspaper in 2002 indicated that between 1940 and 1979, the Ministry of Defence "turned large parts of the country into a giant laboratory to conduct a series of secret germ warfare tests on the public" and many of these tests "involved releasing potentially dangerous chemicals and micro-organisms over vast swathes of the population without the public being told." The Ministry of Defence claims that these trials were to simulate germ warfare and that the tests were harmless. However, families who have been in the area of many of the tests are experiencing children with birth defects and physical and mental handicaps and many are asking for a public inquiry. The report estimated these tests affected millions of people, including during one period between 1961 and 1968 where "more than a million people along the south coast of England, from Torquay to the New Forest, were exposed to bacteria including E.coli and Bacillus globigii, which mimics anthrax." Two scientists commissioned by the Ministry of Defence stated that these trials posed no risk to the public. This was confirmed by Sue Ellison, a representative of the Defence Science and Technology Laboratory at Porton Down who said that the results from these trials "will save lives, should the country or our forces face an attack by chemical and biological weapons."

Territorial Army cuts
In October 2009 the MOD was heavily criticised for withdrawing the bi-annual non-operational training £20m budget for the Territorial Army (TA), ending all non-operational training for 6 months until April 2010. The government eventually backed down and restored the funding. The TA provides a small percentage of the UK's operational troops. Its members train on weekly evenings and monthly weekends, as well as two-week exercises generally annually and occasionally bi-annually for troops doing other courses. The cuts would have meant a significant loss of personnel and would have had adverse effects on recruitment.

Overspending
In 2013 it was found that the Ministry of Defence had overspent on its equipment budget by £6.5bn on orders that could take up to 39 years to fulfil. The Ministry of Defence has been criticised in the past for poor management and financial control.
Specific examples of overspending include:
 Eight Boeing Chinook HC3 were ordered in 1995 as dedicated special forces helicopters. The aircraft were to cost £259 million and the forecast in-service date was November 1998. However, although delivered in 2001, the Mk3 could not receive airworthiness certificates as it was not possible to certify the avionics software, and would not enter service until 2017. The procurement was described by Edward Leigh, then Chairman of the Public Accounts Committee, as "one of the most incompetent procurements of all time" and the National Audit Office issued a scathing report on the affair, stating that the whole programme was likely to cost £500 million.
 In 2010 the Nimrod MRA4 maritime patrol aircraft procurement was cancelled after £3.4 billion had been spent on the programme. In addition there were termination costs which were not disclosed. In January 2011 it was reported by the Financial Times that when the decision was taken to scrap the aircraft, "[it] was still riddled with flaws".

See also
 Defence Review
 The Lancaster House Treaties (2010)
 Stabilisation Unit
 United Kingdom budget
 UK National Defence Association

References

Bibliography
 Chester, D. N and Willson, F. M. G. The Organisation of British Central Government 1914–1964: Chapters VI and X (2nd edition). London: George Allen & Unwin, 1968.

External links

 
 How Defence Works: the defence operating model 

 
1964 establishments in the United Kingdom
United Kingdom
United Kingdom, Defence
Military of the United Kingdom
Military units and formations established in 1964
United Kingdom
British landowners
United Kingdom